The 2022 Pac-12 Conference baseball tournament was held from May 25 through 29 at Scottsdale Stadium in Scottsdale, Arizona.  This was the first postseason championship event sponsored by the Pac-12 Conference since 1978, the first such event to be held at a neutral site, and the first to feature more than two teams.  The eight team, double-elimination tournament winner earned the league's automatic bid to the 2022 NCAA Division I baseball tournament.

Seeds
This tournament featured 8 out of 11 teams in this conference. They played a double elimination tournament. The seedings were determined upon completion of regular season play. The winning percentage of the teams in conference play determined the tournament seedings. There were tiebreakers in place to seed teams with identical conference records.

Bracket

Schedule
2022 Bracket

All-tournament Team
The following players were members of the 2022 Pac-12 Baseball All-Tournament Team.  Player in Bold selected as Tournament MVP.

References

Tournament
Pac-12 Conference Baseball Tournament
Pac-12
College baseball tournaments in Arizona
Baseball competitions in Scottsdale, Arizona